Rumen Gyonov (Bulgarian: Румен Гьонов; born 9 May 1992) is a Bulgarian footballer who plays as a defender for Marek Dupnitsa.

Career

Vitosha Bistritsa
Gyonov made his First League debut for Vitosha Bistritsa in their debut match on the top level against Cherno More Varna.

Career statistics

Club

References

External links
 

1992 births
Living people
Bulgarian footballers
Association football defenders
FC Vitosha Bistritsa players
FC Tsarsko Selo Sofia players
FC Lokomotiv Gorna Oryahovitsa players
PFC Marek Dupnitsa players
First Professional Football League (Bulgaria) players
People from Dupnitsa
Sportspeople from Kyustendil Province